Nimbus 6 (also called Nimbus G) was a meteorological satellite. It was the sixth in a series of the Nimbus program.

Launch 
Nimbus 6 was launched on June 12, 1975, by a Delta rocket from Vandenberg Air Force Base, California, United States. The satellite orbited the Earth once every 107 minutes, at an inclination of 100°.

Instruments 
 Earth Radiation Budget (ERB)
 Electrically Scanning Microwave Radiometer (ESMR)
 High-Resolution Infrared Radiation Sounder (HIRS)
 Limb Radiance Inversion Radiometer (LRIR)
 Pressure Modulated Radiometer (PMR)
 Scanning Microwave Spectrometer (SCAMS)
 Temperature-Humidity Infrared Radiometer (THIR)
 Tracking and Data Relay Experiment (T+DRE)
 Tropical Wind Energy Conversion and Reference Level Experiment (TWERLE)

See also 
 National Oceanic and Atmospheric Administration

References

External links 
 Real Time Satellite Tracking - NIMBUS 6. n2yo.com

Weather satellites of the United States
1975 in spaceflight